The herring cale (Olisthops cyanomelas) is a species of ray-finned fish, a weed whiting from the family Odacidae which is endemic to Australia where it is found along the southern and south eastern coast. This species grows to a length of  SL. This species is the only known member of the genus Olisthops, but it has frequently been placed in Odax instead.

References

Odacidae
Monotypic fish genera
Fish described in 1850